Oxyptilus idonealis is a moth of the family Pterophoridae. It is found in Indonesia on the island of Borneo.

References

Oxyptilini
Moths described in 1864
Plume moths of Asia
Moths of Indonesia
Insects of Borneo